Kato Kintu Kakulukuku (fl. Late 13th century) known in Bunyoro as Kato Kimera was the first kabaka (king) of the Kingdom of Buganda. "Kintu" is an adopted by-name, chosen for Kintu, the name of the first person on earth in Buganda mythology. Kato Kintu gave himself the name "Kintu"  to associate himself with the "father of all people", and he may have renamed his wife, from Nantuttululu to Nambi, because that was Kintu's wife's name.

Background and reign
Kintu was born at Bukasa Village, in the Ssese Islands, on Lake Nalubaale. He established his capital at Nnono, Busujju County. He fathered one child.

 Prince (Omulangira) Mulanga

The final days
Kabaka Kato Kintu died at age thirty. He was buried at Nnono, Busujju County.

Succession table

See also
Kabaka of Buganda
Winyi of Kibulala

References

External links
 List of The Kings of Buganda

Kabakas of Buganda
14th-century monarchs in Africa